Venado Peak is one of the major peaks of the Taos Mountains group of the Sangre de Cristo Mountains, a subrange of the Rocky Mountains. Its summit is the highest point in the Latir Peak Wilderness, part of Carson National Forest. The peak's name means "deer" in Spanish.

The high point of the group of peaks north of the Red River and southwest of Costilla Creek, Venado Peak ranks tenth by elevation and sixth by topographic prominence in the state.

Other peaks in the group include Latir Peak, Virsylvia Peak, Cabresto Peak, Baldy Mountain,  and Pinabete Peak, . (The origins of the names "Latir" and "Virsylvia" are unknown, while "Cabresto" means "rope" or "halter" and "Pinabete" means "pine tree" in Spanish.) Latir Peak is the most well-known of the entire group, despite not being the highest peak, and is the namesake for the surrounding wilderness area, nine small alpine lakes on the northeast side of the group, and a creek draining those lakes. Despite being significantly lower than the other peaks, Pinabete peak is just as visually prominent, as it is the end of a long ridge jutting out southwest toward the plains near Questa.

Just south of the group is Cabresto Creek, and also Cabresto Lake, a popular fishing destination with an established Forest Service campground. The Latir Lakes, and the entire northeast side of the group, are owned by the Rio Costilla Cattle Association, which allows recreational access for a fee. On the southeast side of the group lies Heart Lake. The peaks themselves can be accessed from either Cabresto Lake (via the Lake Fork, Bull Creek, and Heart Lake Trails) or Latir Lakes.

Geologically, the Taos Mountains have a Precambrian metamorphic core, about 1.7 billion years old. However, the region around Venado Peak also includes Tertiary volcanic rocks such as tuff, as well as the remnants of "a complex and mineral-rich caldera that formed about 25 million years ago."

References

External links 
 Carson National Forest official site

Mountains of New Mexico
Sangre de Cristo Mountains
Landforms of Taos County, New Mexico
Carson National Forest
Mountains of Taos County, New Mexico